Wang Zengqi (1920 – 1997) was a contemporary Chinese writer. He is famous for his short stories and essays. He is regarded as a successor of Beijing School Writers.

Biography
Wang was born in a landowner family in 1920 in Gaoyou, Jiangsu province. In 1939, he enrolled into then National Southwestern Associated University. He was tutored by Shen Congwen during his university life and then started writing in 1940. He finished the first draft of Fuchou [Revenge].

He should have graduated in 1943, however, the graduation was postponed to the next year since he failed PE and English. For unknown reason, he failed to obey the university's arrangement to act as an interpreter for the US army, so he didn't get his certificate eventually.

Later he became a teacher at a high school in Kunming from 1944 to 1946, where he fell love with Shi Songqin, and then in Shanghai until 1948. He moved to Beijing and got a job at a museum later in the year. He followed the Fourth Field Army to go to the southern as a civil cadre in the next year. He became an editor after being transferred to Beijing in 1950. He adapted the story of Fan Jin in Chapter 3 of The Scholars for the Peking opera and gained reputation in the 1950s, it also contributed to his being transferred to Beijing Peking Opera Theater in 1961.

He was targeted at the Anti-Rightist Campaign and was banished to Zhangjiakou until 1962. He suffered the plight again since the Cultural Revolution began. That reversed in 1968, since he was summoned by Jiang Qing to improve a play Spark amid the Reed, namely Shajiabang.

He restarted normal writing after the decade. A series of short stories were deemed to be his apogee of writing. The character of his  contemporary works is portraying the rural life lyrically. These works stimulated writers of roots-searching literature in the mid- and late 1980s.

Personal life 
Wang had a grasp of advanced culinary skills, he was considered to be a gourmet. This enthusiasm is also revealed in his many works, such as The Foods in my home town.

Works 
 Shou Jie [Initiation into a Monk's Life]

Notes

References
 

1920 births
1997 deaths
National Southwestern Associated University alumni
Chinese male short story writers
Republic of China essayists
People's Republic of China essayists
Writers from Yangzhou
International Writing Program alumni
20th-century Chinese short story writers
20th-century Chinese male writers
20th-century essayists
Victims of the Anti-Rightist Campaign
Republic of China short story writers
People's Republic of China novelists
Short story writers from Jiangsu
Dramatists of Chinese opera